Brezovica pri Dobu is a settlement in the Municipality of Domžale in the Upper Carniola region of Slovenia. It includes the hamlets of Spodnja Brezovica and Zgornja Brezovica.

History
The settlement is a former part of the Krumperk lordship.

Name
The name of the settlement was changed from Brezovica to Brezovica pri Dobu in 1953. In the past the German name was Bresowitz.

References

External links 

Brezovica pri Dobu on Geopedia

Populated places in the Municipality of Domžale